The Center for Cultural Studies is a research center at the University of California, Santa Cruz. Founded in 1988, the Center encourages a broad range of research in Cultural studies, particularly across disciplinary boundaries. The Center's activities include a Resident Scholars program, research clusters, conferences, lectures and colloquia.

2009 advisory board
James Clifford 
Christopher Connery 
Susan Gillman 
Donna Haraway 
James McCloskey 
Lisa Rofel
Anna Tsing 
Vanita Seth
Carla Freccero, Director

External links

University of California, Santa Cruz
Cultural studies organizations